Mattinata is a  seaside resort town and comune (municipality) in the province of Foggia, Apulia, southern Italy.

Geography
The only town in Apulia facing south the Adriatic sea, Mattinata is part of the Gargano National Park (Parco Nazionale del Gargano). The main urban area is located up on two hills enclosed by mountains in the northern, western and southern sides. The town faces eastward a plain (Piana di Mattinata) facing the Adriatic sea. 

The northern coastal part is known for its chalky white cliffs, its large number of suggestive sea grottos and, above all, for its two Faraglioni stacks located in the Zagare Bay area. The area surrounding Mattinata is also a popular destination for botanical experts, due to the existence of around 60 different species of orchids.

History
The first humans to settle in the area were tribes of Eastern European origin, mainly from Greece and the Balkans (Iapyges), which populated the surrounding areas since the 5th century BC. 

The origins of the name Mattinata can be traced back to the Roman village of Matinum, which was located near the current sea port in the 1st century AD. Relatively few traces of the Roman settlement can still be found. The modern town is the result of the direct immigration of citizens from Monte Sant'Angelo over different centuries, which administered the town until 1955, year of its independence as a municipality.

Main sights
Necropolis of Monte Saraceno, which includes more than 500 Daunian graves
Ruins of the Santissima Trinità Benedictine Abbey'
Ruins of the Roman town of Matinum, located near the harbour
Faraglioni rocks in the  Zagare Bay.

Economy
The economy of Mattinata is strongly based on services and, to a lesser extent, on farming and livestock. Tourism plays an important role in the community. Farm products include olive oil, almonds and figs. Livestock consists mainly of cattle and goats.

References

External links

 Official website
 Mattinata.it 
 Mattinata Net

Cities and towns in Apulia